Mount Deakin is a prominent mountain in Antarctica, rising to , at the east side of Beardmore Glacier, just north of the mouth of Osicki Glacier. It was discovered by the British Antarctic Expedition, 1907–09, and named by Ernest Shackleton for Alfred Deakin, Prime Minister of Australia, who had supported the expedition.

References
 

Mountains of the Ross Dependency
Dufek Coast